Lisa Bevill (born June 24, 1961) is an American contemporary Christian musician. Bevill has released five albums: My Freedom (1992), All Because of You (1994), Love of Heaven (1996), Lisa Bevill (2000) and When the Healing Comes (2008).

Personal life
North Carolina  native Bevill and her husband Jeff have two grown sons and two grandchildren and live near Nashville, Tennessee. Retired from touring/performing onstage as a CCM artist as of 2008, she works as a studio singer, singing background vocals on albums and jingles/TV commercials/voiceover work. She is currently the voice of the "Stanley Steemer" TV/radio commercial.

Bevill also spends her time advocating for those newly diagnosed with Lyme disease. She herself spent 12 years in treatment and is currently Lyme-free.  She advocates/educates and helps other Lyme sufferers get properly tested thru I-Genex and to find a LLMD in their area.

Awards and nominations
Dove Award Nomination - "Special Event Album of the Year for "My Utmost for His Highest" - "The Covenant" "I Will Follow You" Lisa Bevill and John Elefante
Dove Award Nomination - "Special Event Album of the Year "Sisters: The Story Goes On", "Somehow She Stays" Lisa Bevill and Cynthia Clawson
Best Christian Video / Christian Category - Houston Film Festival Gold Award: "Chaperone"
Dove Award Nomination - "Best Short-Form Video of the Year": "Chaperone"

Discography

Studio albums
 1992: My Freedom
 1994: All Because of You
 1996: Love of Heaven
 2000: Lisa Bevill
 2008: When the Healing Comes

No. 1 songs from Bevill's career include "My Freedom", "Place in the Sun", "No Condemnation", "Turn and Love", "Tender Reed", "Only a Savior", and "If We're His", which was voted the No. 1 Inspirational Song of the Year in 1997 by CCM chart.

References

External links
 Lisa Bevill official site
 

1961 births
Living people
American women pop singers
Musicians from Nashville, Tennessee
Musicians from Asheville, North Carolina
American performers of Christian music
21st-century American women singers